Kraurosis vulvae or vulvar lichen sclerosus (VLS) is a cutaneous condition characterized by atrophy and shrinkage of the skin of the vagina and vulva often accompanied by a chronic inflammatory reaction in the deeper tissues.

See also 
 Lichen sclerosus
 Balanitis xerotica obliterans
 List of cutaneous conditions

References

External links 

Lichenoid eruptions
Noninflammatory disorders of female genital tract